Semutophila is a genus of moths belonging to the subfamily Olethreutinae of the family Tortricidae.

Species
Semutophila saccharopa Tuck, in Maschwitz, Dumpert & Tuck, 1986
Semutophila susurra Tuck, in Maschwitz, Dumpert & Tuck, 1986

See also
List of Tortricidae genera

References

External links
tortricidae.com

Olethreutini
Tortricidae genera